Maurice Foulon (1886-1968) was a French politician. He served as a member of the Chamber of Deputies from 1928 to 1936, representing Seine.

References

1886 births
1968 deaths
People from Pantin
Politicians from Île-de-France
Members of the 14th Chamber of Deputies of the French Third Republic
Members of the 15th Chamber of Deputies of the French Third Republic